Jonathan Elias Caicedo Valencia (born 25 December 1996) is an Ecuadorian footballer who plays as a winger.

Club career
Born in Esmeraldas on Christmas 1996, Caicedo joined the youth teams of the third-tier side from Guayaquil, Club Sport Norte América in April 2011. He remained at the club until early May 2018, when he moved to neighboring :es:9 de Octubre Fútbol Club.

In late October 2018, Caicedo joined the top-tier Croatian side NK Istra 1961 on a three-year long contract, becoming the first Ecuadorian ever to feature in Croatian football. He made his league debut in the 1–0 away loss to Lokomotiva Zagreb, on November 3, 2018, having already debuted for the club in the Croatian Football Cup match against Inter Zaprešić on October 30, 2018.

References

External links

1996 births
Living people
Sportspeople from Esmeraldas, Ecuador
Ecuadorian footballers
Association football wingers
NK Istra 1961 players
Ecuadorian expatriate footballers
Ecuadorian expatriate sportspeople in Croatia
Expatriate footballers in Croatia
C.S. Norte América footballers